John William Comber, M.M. (March 12, 1906 – March 27, 1998) was an American-born Catholic missionary and bishop. As a member of the Catholic Foreign Mission Society of America (Maryknoll), he was assigned to missions in China, Peru, and Chile.  He served as the Superior General of Maryknoll from 1956 to 1966.

Early life and education
John Comber was born in Lawrence, Massachusetts, to Thomas F. and Nora (Higgins) Comber.  He was educated at St. Mary’s Grade School in Lawrence and St. John’s Preparatory School in Danvers, Massachusetts. He studied at Boston College for two years after which he entered Maryknoll Seminary in Ossining, New York. Comber earned a Bachelor of Sacred Theology at The Catholic University of America in Washington, D.C.  He was ordained a priest on February 1, 1931.

Priesthood
After his ordination Comber spent eleven years in the Maryknoll Mission at Fushun, China.  He learned to speak and write Mandarin fluently.  After the outbreak of World War II Comber and his two sisters, Sr. Rita Clare, M.M., and Sr. Francis Helena, S.N.D. who were also missionaries in Japanese controlled territories, were interned by the Japanese military.  They were among the second exchange of nationals repatriated to the United States in December 1943.  After a period of recuperation, Comber was assigned to teach Mission Sociology at Maryknoll Seminary in January 1944 and five months later he became the school's rector.  During his time as rector, 416 Maryknollers were ordained priests.  In 1953 he was assigned to the mission field in Peru, where he learned Spanish.  The following year he was appointed Group Superior for the new Maryknoll Mission in Chile.

Comber was chosen as a delegate to the Fourth General Chapter of Maryknoll. On August 6, 1956, he was elected as the Fourth Superior General of the Society.  During his ten years in office, Maryknoll experienced a period of rapid growth.  They realized their largest number of members and mission commitments.  While remaining as Superior General, Pope John XXIII appointed him as the Titular Bishop of Foratiana on January 23, 1959.

Episcopacy
John Comber was consecrated a bishop on April 9, 1959, in Queen of Apostles Chapel at Maryknoll Seminary by Cardinal Francis Spellman of New York. The principal co-consecrators were Bishops Raymond Lane, M.M., Comber's predecessor as Superior General, and Martin McNamara of Joliet in Illinois.  Comber attended all four sessions of the Second Vatican Council.  After the Council he was appointed as a member of the Post-Conciliar Commission on Missions.  After his term as Superior General he served as an Auxiliary Bishop in the Archdiocese of New York.  Cardinal Spellman appointed him the pastor of the Church of the Transfiguration in Lower Manhattan in 1967. He retired after two years and moved to the Maryknoll Development House on East 39th Street. Later that year he moved to St. Agnes Rectory in Midtown Manhattan.  He served as auxiliary bishop until his resignation was accepted by Pope Paul VI on January 12, 1976.

Later life and death
As his health declined Comber moved to the St. Teresa Residence in Ossining where he remained until his death.  He died on March 27, 1998, at the age of 92.  His funeral Mass was celebrated in the Queen of Apostles Chapel on April 1, 1998, by New York Auxiliary Bishop Patrick Sheridan.  He was buried in the Maryknoll Center Cemetery.

References

1906 births
1998 deaths
People from Lawrence, Massachusetts
Maryknoll bishops
Maryknoll Seminary alumni
Catholic University of America alumni
American Roman Catholic missionaries
Roman Catholic missionaries in China
Roman Catholic missionaries in Peru
Roman Catholic missionaries in Chile
20th-century American Roman Catholic titular bishops
Participants in the Second Vatican Council
American expatriates in China
American expatriates in Chile
American expatriates in Peru
Catholics from Massachusetts